Milija Miletić (born 1968) is a politician in Serbia. He was president (i.e., mayor) of the municipality of Svrljig for most of the period from 2008 to 2014 and has served in the National Assembly of Serbia since 2014. Miletić is the leader of the United Peasant Party.

Early life and career
Miletić was born in the village of Plužina, in what was then the Socialist Republic of Serbia in the Socialist Federal Republic of Yugoslavia. He lives in nearby Svrljig, is a field veterinarian, and was a union activist before entering political life.

Political career

Municipal politics
Miletić ran unsuccessfully for mayor of Svrljig in the 2004 local elections, in which mayors were directly elected. He was chosen as the municipality's deputy mayor after the election and served in this role for the next four years.

The direct election of mayors was abandoned with the 2008 local elections. The United Peasant Party won a plurality victory in the Svrljig assembly election, and Miletić was chosen as mayor when the assembly convened. He was removed from office by the assembly in December 2009 but returned to power four months later via an alliance with the Serbian Radical Party.

Although the United Peasant Party had existed as a de facto political party since 2000, it was not registered until 2010. Miletić was recognized as the party's first official leader.

He was chosen for another term as mayor after the 2012 local elections and served in the position until his election to the national assembly in 2014. He has remained active in local politics since then, arranging an alliance between the United Peasant Party and the Serbian Progressive Party in the community for the 2016 Serbian local elections. Notwithstanding some subsequent disagreements between the parties, he was re-elected to another term in the local assembly in the 2020 local elections at the head of the Progressive Party's coalition list.

Member of the National Assembly
Miletić received the ninety-seventh position on the Serbian Progressive Party's Aleksandar Vučić — Future We Believe In electoral list in the 2014 Serbian parliamentary election and was elected when the list won a landslide victory with 158 out of 250 mandates. He received the same position on the Progressive-led list in the 2016 election and was re-elected when the list won a second consecutive majority with 131 mandates.

In the 2016–20 parliament, Miletić was a member of the agriculture, forestry, and water management committee; a deputy member of the committee on the rights of the child; the chair of a subcommittee for monitoring agriculture in the most under-developed areas of Serbia; a member of Serbia's delegation to the parliamentary assembly of the Organization of the Black Sea Economic Cooperation; the head of Serbia's parliamentary friendship group with Slovenia; and a member of Serbia's parliamentary friendship groups with Albania, Austria, Azerbaijan, Belarus, Belgium, Bosnia and Herzegovina, Brazil, Bulgaria, Canada, China, Croatia, Czech Republic, Denmark, Egypt, Finland, France, Germany, Greece, Hungary, Italy, Japan, North Macedonia, Montenegro, Morocco, the Netherlands, Norway, Poland, Romania, Russia, Slovakia, Spain, Sweden, Switzerland, Tunisia, Turkey, the United Kingdom, and the United States of America. He served with the Movement of Socialists–People's Peasant Party–United Peasant Party parliamentary group, which supported the Progressive-led administration.

He received the eighty-fourth position on the Progressive Party's Aleksandar Vučić — For Our Children coalition list in the 2020 Serbian parliamentary election and was elected to a third term when the list won a landslide majority with 188 mandates. He continues to serve on the agriculture committee and is a member of the committee on the rights of the child and a deputy member of the committee on labour, social issues, social inclusion, and poverty reduction. He is still a member of Serbia's delegation of the parliamentary assembly of the Organization of the Black Sea Economic Cooperation and the leader of Serbia's friendship group with Slovenia, and he is a member of the friendship groups with Albania, Azerbaijan, Belarus, Bulgaria, Croatia, Germany, Greece, Hungary, Italy, Japan, Montenegro, North Macedonia, Norway, Russia, Spain, Turkey, and the United States of America.

In December 2020, Miletić formed a parliamentary group with the four assembly members of the Justice and Reconciliation Party. Miletić is the deputy head of the group.

Electoral record

Local (Municipality of Svrljig)

References

1968 births
Living people
People from Svrljig
Mayors of places in Serbia
Members of the National Assembly (Serbia)
Members of the Parliamentary Assembly of the Black Sea Economic Cooperation
United Peasant Party politicians